Halone prosenes, the pied halone, is a moth of the subfamily Arctiinae first described by Turner in 1940. It is known from the Australian state of Victoria, where it is restricted to the South East Coastal Plain, South Eastern Highlands and the Victorian Volcanic Plain.

The wingspan is about 15 mm. Adult have white forewings with a variable complex pattern of shades of grey including a broad jagged dark grey band across the middle. The hindwings are plain grey.

References

Lithosiini